Kirtland is a city in Lake County, Ohio, United States. The population was 6,937 at the 2020 census. Kirtland is known for being the early headquarters of the Latter Day Saint movement from 1831 to 1837 and is the site of the movement's first temple, the Kirtland Temple, completed in 1836. The city is also the location for many parks in the Lake Metroparks system, as well as the Holden Arboretum.

History
After the founding of the United States, northern Ohio was designated as the Western Reserve and was sold to the Connecticut Land Company. The area was first surveyed by Moses Cleaveland and his party in 1796.

Kirtland is named for Turhand Kirtland, a principal of the Connecticut Land Company and judge in Trumbull County, the first political entity in Ohio that included Kirtland township. Kirtland, a veteran of the American Revolutionary War, demonstrated "both breadth of vision and integrity" in his fair dealings with the local Native Americans. He was known for his bravery, resourcefulness, and passion for justice. Dr. Jared Potter Kirtland was the son of the former; he helped to found a medical college in nearby Willoughby, Ohio, and he compiled the first ornithology of Ohio. The bird Kirtland's warbler is named for Jared Kirtland. This rare species has been documented in the city during migration, but it does not nest in Ohio.

Being less well suited to agriculture, the densely forested, clay soiled, high, hilly, land of Kirtland was settled later than surrounding townships: Mentor in 1798, and Chester in 1802. Kirtland's first European settlers were the John Moore family, soon followed by the Crary family who came to Kirtland in 1811. In 1893 Christopher Crary wrote a memoir of his Kirtland life, which provided a great deal of material for Anne B. Prusha's 1982 history of Kirtland.

Headquarters of the Latter Day Saint movement
From 1831 to 1832 and again from 1833 to 1838, Kirtland was the headquarters for the Latter Day Saint movement. Joseph Smith moved the church to Kirtland in 1831, shortly after its formal organization in April 1830 in Fayette, New York. Latter Day Saints built their first temple there, a historic landmark owned and operated by Community of Christ, one of the main Latter Day Saint movement groups. The temple was built with a degree of opulence, considering the underdeveloped nature of the area and the poverty of most early church members. Many attending the Kirtland Temple dedication in 1836 claimed to see multiple heavenly visions and appearances of heavenly beings, including deity. For this and other reasons, Kirtland remains a place of importance to those of all Latter Day Saint denominations. Many sections from the Doctrine and Covenants, considered modern revelations and canonical by most denominations within the Latter Day Saint movement, originated in Kirtland during the 1830s.

Ownership of the Kirtland Temple came into question after the main body of Latter Day Saints moved west. The Reorganized Church of Jesus Christ of Latter Day Saints (now Community of Christ) sought to have the matter settled in civil court; but ultimately obtained ownership of the property by virtue of Adverse Possession. Today, besides giving tours, the Community of Christ allows others to use the temple for special meetings.

1838 to present
After the majority of the Latter Day Saints departed Kirtland in 1837–38, and during the latter part of the 19th century, Kirtland's population diminished and life was typical of that of the region. Crary recalls the last rattlesnakes being killed on Gildersleeve Mountain in the 1830s. During this period most of the wooded areas near Kirtland were cleared for agriculture, with corn and apples being the predominant crops.

In the early 20th century, Kirtland School (now Kirtland Elementary) was built to consolidate 3 school houses. One of the old school houses can still be found at the corner of Baldwin and Booth Roads in Kirtland Hills.

Kirtland saw few changes until after World War II when several residential subdivisions were built. In 1957 a high school was built and in 1961, Gildersleeve Elementary was built along Chardon Rd. (US 6). In 1968 a middle school was completed for grades 6–8.

In 1968 the citizens of Kirtland voted in a special election to incorporate the township. James Naughton was the first mayor of the village, which became a city when the 1970 census showed population exceeded 5000. Naughton was succeeded as mayor by Doug Guy, Wesley Phillips, Mario Marcopoli, Edward Podajol, and Mark Tyler.

The 1960s saw an influx and expansion of local businesses. A shopping center was built, which combined the hardware, drug store, grocery, barber shop, plus the local doctor and dentist in one building. By 1965, Interstate 90 was open, allowing a quicker trip into Cleveland, Ohio.

Kirtland continued to grow in population slowly through the 1970s and 1980s.

In April 1989, Jeffrey Lundgren, a religious extremist, coerced some in his cult into murdering a family of five and hiding their bodies in a pit dug inside a barn, on Chardon Road (U.S. 6). Those of Lundgren's cult who participated in the murders were sentenced to life in prison; Lundgren was executed on October 24, 2006.

The site of the murders was converted from a privately owned home into a church beginning in 2007. New Promise Church opened in April 2009.

In the 1990s, as Kirtland became an increasingly popular tourist destination, Historic Kirtland Village was created in the Kirtland flats along the East Branch of the Chagrin River. The buildings in this area preserve or replicate structures that were present in the 1830s. Historic Kirtland structures, many of which are related to early Mormon history, include the NK Whitney home (original structure), Newel K. Whitney Store (original structure), a sawmill (replica), an ashery, the Sidney Rigdon home (original structure), and the John Johnson Inn. This area provides insight into what life was like during the period when Kirtland was the home of Joseph Smith, Brigham Young, and other founders of Mormonism. Community of Christ and the Church of Jesus Christ of Latter-day Saints (LDS Church) both operate visitor centers and give tours of the buildings and sites which they own. A group of volunteers puts on an annual musical theater production celebrating the city's Latter Day Saint history called "This Is Kirtland!", which is held at the nearby LDS meetinghouse.

In 2003, Schupp's farm and orchard, on Hobart Road, became inactive leaving Rock's farm on Chillicothe Road, the only active for-profit farm in the city. As of 2006, there are still active cattle and horse farming in the city and some commercial nursery activity. Sugaring still occurs, with at least 2 active sugar bushes other than the large scale Bicknell Sugar Bush at the Holden Arboretum.

Kirtland has been visited by two sitting Presidents of the United States, including George W. Bush.

Geography

Kirtland is located south of the lake shore plain of Lake Erie and is situated on the higher elevations of the Allegheny Plateau. The principal geographic features are the East Branch of the Chagrin River, Pierson's Knob, and Gildersleeve Mountain,  Daniel's Mountain, is the high point.

Native vegetation is northern hardwood forest. Hemlock-hardwood forest is found in the higher elevations and along ravines, beech-maple forest is predominant in other areas. A few stands of old growth oak-hickory forest can also be found in the city.

Kirtland is located in the snowbelt region of Lake Erie, and has snowfall and weather patterns similar to nearby Chardon.

Kirtland is primarily a residential community. Over 20 percent of the land area is forest preserve or park land. Three metropolitan parks are also in Kirtland. Also in Kirtland are Penitentiary Glen, and the Lake Farm Park. Lakeland Community College is located largely in the City of Kirtland, the campus dominating the northern part of the city.

Demographics

In 2018 languages spoken in the city were: 92.5% English, 2.2% Croatian, 1.5% Italian, and 1.5% Slovene.

2010 census
As of the 2010 Census, there were 6,866 people, 2,544 households, and 1,948 families residing in the city. The racial makeup of the city was 97.7% White, 0.4% African American, 0.1% Native American, 0.7% Asian, 0.2% from other races, and 0.9% from two or more races. Hispanic or Latino of any race were 1.1% of the population.

There were 2,544 households, of which 31.2% had children under the age of 18 living with them, 66.3% were married couples living together, 7.0% had a female householder with no husband present, 3.3% had a male householder with no wife present, and 23.4% were non-families. 20.2% of all households were made up of individuals, and 8.1% had someone living alone who was 65 years of age or older. The average household size was 2.63 and the average family size was 3.05.

The median age in the city was 46.9 years. 23% of residents were under the age of 18; 5.8% were between the ages of 18 and 24; 17.8% were from 25 to 44; 34.3% were from 45 to 64; and 19.1% were 65 years of age or older. The gender makeup of the city was 49.3% male and 50.7% female.

Of the city's population over the age of 25, 39.4% hold a bachelor's degree or higher.

2000 census
At the 2000 Census, there were 6,670 people, 2,445 households, and 1,885 families residing in the city. The population density was 401.8 people per square mile (155.1/km2). There were 2,558 housing units at an average density of 154.1 per square mile (59.5/km2). The racial makeup of the city was 98.47% White, 0.27% African American, 0.15% Native American, 0.39% Asian, 0.03% Pacific Islander, 0.03% from other races, and 0.66% from two or more races. Hispanic or Latino of any race were 0.55% of the population. 18.5% were of German, 14.3% Italian, 12.0% Irish, 9.6% English and 6.2% Slovene ancestry according to Census 2000.

There were 2,445 households, out of which 31.6% had children under the age of 18 living with them, 67.9% were married couples living together, 6.1% had a female householder with no husband present, and 22.9% were non-families. 19.8% of all households were made up of individuals, and 7.4% had someone living alone who was 65 years of age or older. The average household size was 2.65 and the average family size was 3.06.

In the city the population was spread out, with 23.7% under the age of 18, 6.2% from 18 to 24, 24.6% from 25 to 44, 30.7% from 45 to 64, and 14.8% who were 65 years of age or older. The median age was 42 years. For every 100 females, there were 97.5 males. For every 100 females age 18 and over, there were 95.1 males.

The median income for a household in the city was $65,422, and the median income for a family was $76,062. Males had a median income of $51,179 versus $31,179 for females. The per capita income for the city was $32,148. About 1.8% of families and 2.3% of the population were below the poverty line, including 3.7% of those under age 18 and 1.5% of those age 65 or over.

Notable people
Alma M. Aldrich, member of the Wisconsin State Assembly, born in Kirtland in 1837
Elizabeth Watson Russell Lord, educator and philanthropist, born and raised in Kirtland from 1819 to 1847
Jeffrey Lundgren, religious extremist and convicted mass-murderer, lived in Kirtland from 1987 to 1989 
Emma Smith, wife of Latter Day Saint movement founder Joseph Smith, lived in Kirtland from 1831 to 1832 and 1833 to 1838
Joseph Smith, founder and leader of the Latter Day Saint movement, lived in Kirtland from 1831 to 1832 and from 1833 to 1838
Newel K. Whitney, early leader of the Latter Day Saint movement lived in Kirtland from 1819 to 1838
Brigham Young, second president of The Church of Jesus Christ of Latter-day Saints, lived in Kirtland from 1833 to 1837

See also
 Kirtland Safety Society

References

Further reading
Prusha, Anne B., A History of Kirtland, Ohio.  1983 Lakeland Community College Press.
Rosche, Larry (editor), Birds of the Cleveland Region. 2005 Cleveland Museum of Natural History

External links

 
Cities in Ohio
Cities in Lake County, Ohio
Latter Day Saint movement in Ohio
Significant places in Mormonism
Mormonism-related controversies
Populated places established in 1811
Cleveland metropolitan area
1811 establishments in Ohio